The Indian Journal of Urology is a peer-reviewed open access medical journal published by Medknow Publications on behalf of the Urological Society of India. The journal cover research in urology, including oncology, sexual dysfunction, incontinence, endourology, trauma and reconstructive surgery, andrology, transplantation, imaging, and pathology.

Abstracting and indexing 
The journal is abstracted and indexed in:
 Abstracts on Hygiene and Communicable Diseases
 CAB Abstracts
 EBSCO databases
 Excerpta Medica/EMBASE
 Expanded Academic ASAP
 Pubmed Central
 Scopus

External links 
 

Open access journals
Quarterly journals
English-language journals
Urology journals
Medknow Publications academic journals
Publications established in 1985
Academic journals associated with learned and professional societies of India
1985 establishments in India